Love Has No Language is a 2008 film directed by Ken Khan. Film stars Celina Jaitley, Rati Agnihotri, Colin Mathura-Jeffree, Ben Mitchell and Kiran Kumar.

Plot 
This film is a love story between an Indian girl and a Māori guy. Their love is not approved by their families.

Cast 
 ( Yazmeen (Acikgoez) Baker): Tara
 Celina Jaitley: Marina Roy
 Benjamin Mitchell: Lucky Shaman
 Colin Mathura-Jeffree: Sidth Reddy
 Kiran Kumar: Mr Roy
 Rati Agnihotri: Mrs Roy
 Peter Mochrie: Officer Eastwood
 Rob Williams: Sam
 James Gray: Terry
 Martyn Williams: Mr Smith

References

2008 films
English films
2000s English-language films